CICC-TV (channel 10) is a television station in Yorkton, Saskatchewan, Canada, part of the CTV Television Network. Owned and operated by network parent Bell Media, it is a semi-satellite of CKCK-DT in Regina. CICC-TV's studios are located on Broadway Street East and 6 Avenue North in Yorkton, and its transmitter is located adjacent to Highway 52, west of the city. The station operates rebroadcast transmitters in Norquay, Hudson Bay, Carlyle Lake, Wynyard and Humboldt.

History
CICC signed on for the first time on Labour Day 1971, owned by Yorkton Television along with CKOS-TV. In 1984, it became sister station to Prince Albert's CBC affiliate, CKBI-TV. Baton Broadcasting acquired it in 1986 as part of its merger with Yorkton Television. When Baton bought controlling interest in CTV in 1996, CICC became the network's second-smallest O&O.

In 2002, CTV parent company Bell Media sold CICC's former CBC Television-affiliated twinstick sister station, CKOS-TV, to the CBC, which then made CKOS-TV a rebroadcaster of CBKT-DT in Regina.

Notable former on-air staff
Rob Brown (now anchor with CBC News Calgary)
Robin Gill (now anchor with Global National)
Bob Maloney (current Mayor of Yorkton)
Natasha Staniszewski

Former transmitters

* CICC-TV-3 was among a long list of CTV rebroadcasters nationwide to have shut down on or before August 31, 2009, as part of a political dispute with Canadian authorities on paid fee-for-carriage requirements for cable television operators. A subsequent change in ownership assigned full control of CTVglobemedia to Bell Canada; as of 2011, these transmitters remain in normal licensed broadcast operation. Another transmitter that rebroadcast CICC-TV, CIWH-TV-1 channel 32 of Humboldt, was also on that list; that transmitter closed in late 2010.

On February 11, 2016, Bell Media applied for its regular license renewals, which included applications to delete a long list of transmitters, including all of CICC's rebroadcasters. Bell Media's rationale for deleting these analog repeaters is below:

"We are electing to delete these analog transmitters from the main licence with which they are associated. These analog transmitters generate no incremental revenue, attract little to no viewership given the growth of BDU or DTH subscriptions and are costly to maintain, repair or replace. In addition, none of the highlighted transmitters offer any programming that differs from the main channels. The Commission has determined that broadcasters may elect to shut down transmitters but will lose certain regulatory privileges (distribution on the basic service, the ability to request simultaneous substitution) as noted in Broadcasting Regulatory Policy CRTC 2015-24, Over-the-air transmission of television signals and local programming. We are fully aware of the loss of these regulatory privileges as a result of any transmitter shutdown."

References

External links

CICC-TV history - Canadian Communication Foundation

ICC-TV
Mass media in Yorkton
Television channels and stations established in 1971
ICC-TV